Đông Quang is a commune in Đông Sơn District, Thanh Hóa Province, Vietnam. The commune is located in the south of the district and borders with Đông Vinh commune in the west, with Đông Nam commune in the south, and with Đông Hưng commune in the north.

History
During the Nguyễn dynasty, Đông Quang commune belonged to Đông Sơn district, Thieu Hoa "phủ", and consisted of the following villages: Văn Ba, Đồng Đức  Thịnh Trị, Đôi Dọ, and Quang Vinh và Thạch Thất.

The Đông Sơn Commune was named in 1953.

In 1977, Chu River right bank communes of Thieu Hoa district merged with the Đông Sơn districts to established Dong Thieu District. Đông Quang commune belonged the Dong Thieu district.

In 1982, Dong Thieu District changed into Đông Sơn District, and Đông Quang commune returned to Đông Sơn. Đông Quang's villages today include Quang Vinh, Minh Thành, Đức Thắng, divided 12 small villages from  1 to 12.

Location
According to reported Census population in 1999, Đông Quang commune has the population of 5,166.

References 

Populated places in Thanh Hóa province